Ciaz may refer to:

Suzuki Ciaz, car produced by Suzuki
Ciaz, nickname of italian ice hockey and ice sledge hockey player and coach Andrea Chiarotti